The Sony α99 II is a flagship Sony SLT camera and continues the line of Sony A-mount camera bodies. It was first announced by Sony on September 19, 2016 at photokina 2016 and replaced the original Sony α99. Its single-lens translucent design allows for faster focusing and shooting than DSLRs. Consequently, at 12 FPS, it can shoot roughly twice as fast in continuous burst mode as competing models as of 2016. The α99 II also features best-in-class low-light autofocus.

Initial demand for the camera exceeded the supply in Japan and major American retailers also quickly sold out of allocated amounts and had backordered supplies as of December 2016.

The a99 II was the last a-mount camera. After five years from its launch, Sony decided to discontinue all a-mount cameras including  the a99 II, in 2021. That was the end of the a-mount cameras lineup that lasted 36 years from 1985 during the Minolta SLR film era until 2021 with Sony digital SLT technology.

See also 
Exmor R

References 

99M2
Cameras introduced in 2016
Live-preview digital cameras
Full-frame DSLR cameras